Melanostachya is a monotypic genus of flowering plants belonging to the family Restionaceae. The only species is Melanostachya ustulata.

Its native range is Southwestern Australia.

References

Restionaceae
Monotypic Poales genera